The Virginia League (1894–1896) was a minor league baseball organization active in central Virginia.

History

In 1894, the Virginia League began play as an Independent level league and fielded six teams: the Lynchburg, Virginia based Lynchburg Hill Climbers, the Norfolk, Virginia based Norfolk Clam Eaters, the Petersburg Farmers, the Richmond Bluebirds, the Roanoke, Virginia based Roanoke Magicians, and the Staunton, Virginia based Staunton Hayseeds / Newport News, Virginia-Hampton, Virginia based Newport News-Hampton Deckhands (the team relocated in the middle of the 1894 season).

In 1895, the league was upgraded to a Class B level league.  The teams during the 1895 season were the Lynchburg Hill Climbers, the Norfolk Clams/Crows, the Petersburg Farmers, the Portsmouth Truckers, the Richmond Blue Birds, and the Roanoke Magicians.

In 1896, the Norfolk team became the Norfolk Braves, the Portsmouth team became the Portsmouth Browns and then moved to Hampton and became the Hampton-Newport News Clamdiggers.

1894–1896 cities represented

Lynchburg, VA: Lynchburg Hill Climbers 1894; Lynchburg Tobacconists 1895–1896 
Newport News, VA & Hampton, VA: Newport News-Hampton Deck Hands 1894; Hampton-Newport News Clamdiggers 1896 
Norfolk, VA: Norfolk Clam Eaters 1894; Norfolk Clams/Norfolk Crows 1895; Norfolk Braves 1896 
Petersburg, VA: Petersburg Farmers 1894–1896 
Portsmouth, VA: Portsmouth Truckers 1895; Portsmouth Browns 1896 
Richmond, VA: Richmond Crows/Richmond Colts 1894; Richmond Bluebirds 1895-1896 
Roanoke, VA: Roanoke Magicians 1894–1896 
Staunton, VA: Staunton Hayseeds 1894

1894–1896 standings and statistics 

1894 Virginia State League
 Staunton (36-53) moved to Newport News-Hampton August 14.
 
1895 Virginia State League 
 No Playoffs Scheduled. 

1896 Virginia State League
  Petersburg (32–60) moved to Hampton August 13.  Roanoke disbanded August 20; Lynchburg disbanded August 22. The league played a three part split season.

References 

Defunct minor baseball leagues in the United States
Baseball leagues in Virginia
1894 establishments in Virginia
1986 disestablishments in Virginia
Sports leagues established in 1894
Sports leagues disestablished in 1896